Neckargerach is a municipality in the district of Neckar-Odenwald-Kreis, in Baden-Württemberg, Germany.

Mayors
 1915–1919: Johann Georg Steck, butcher
 1919–1924: Heinrich Gramlich
 1924–1933: Carl Bödigheimer I
 1933–1935: Rudolf Bödigheimer
 1935–1937: Ludwig Menges
 1937–1945: Christian Seemann, master electrician
 1945–1965: Karl Wettmann, farmer
 1965–1974: Peter Kirchesch senior
 1974–2006: Peter Kirchesch junior
 2006–2010: Ralf Schnörr
 since March 2010: Norman Link

References

External links
 

Neckar-Odenwald-Kreis
Populated places on the Neckar basin
Populated riverside places in Germany